Truskava  is a small town in Kaunas County in central Lithuania. In 2011 it had a population of 129.

History
Formerly in the Poniewieski poviat, the nearby Truszkovski estate was confiscated in 1831.

References

This article was initially translated from the Lithuanian Wikipedia.

Kėdainiai District Municipality
Towns in Kaunas County